The UK Indie Chart is a chart that ranks the biggest-selling singles which are released in the United Kingdom on independent labels. The chart is compiled by the Official Chart Company and is based on both physical and digital sales of tracks, released independently of any major record labels.

Summary
The year opened to British singer Adele resuming her reign atop the independent releases chart with the number-one single, "Someone Like You" (2011). The song previously topped the chart for eleven non-consecutive weeks in 2011, including a nine-week run from February to April. Marking her twelfth week atop the chart with "Someone Like You", Adele was then dethroned by singer James Vincent McMorrow and his cover of the Steve Winwood song "Higher Love" - which rose to success following its inclusion on the 2011/2 LoveFilm advertisement. 15 January then saw American singer Lana Del Rey climb to the chart summit with "Video Games", although it was limited to a week at the summit following its exclusion from the independent releases chart. On 22 January, Charlene Soraia returned to the chart summit with her rendition of The Calling's "Wherever You Will Go", having previously spent nine consecutive weeks at the top with the track. The track spent four weeks at the summit, bringing its total to thirteen, before DJ Fresh and the Rita Ora-assisted "Hot Right Now" debuted at number-one on the chart, UK Singles Chart and UK Dance Chart - having sold an incredible 127,998 copies in the seven-day period.

Chart history

See also
List of UK Singles Chart number ones of the 2010s
List of UK Dance Singles Chart number ones of 2012
List of UK Independent Albums Chart number ones of 2012
List of UK Singles Downloads Chart number ones of the 2000s
List of UK Rock & Metal Singles Chart number ones of 2012
List of UK R&B Singles Chart number ones of 2012

Notes
 – The single was simultaneously number-one on the singles chart.

Number-one artists

References

Number-one indie singles
UK Indie Singles
Indie 2012